The Sixth ARMM Regional Legislative Assembly was a meeting of the unicameral regional legislature of the Autonomous Region in Muslim Mindanao (ARMM).

The meeting was headed by Rejie Sahali-Generale who was speaker until July 5, 2010, when she became Acting Vice Governor of the ARMM. From that date Ronnie Sinsuat served as speaker of the assembly.

Members

See also
Autonomous Region in Muslim Mindanao
ARMM Regional Legislative Assembly

References

ARMM Regional Legislative Assembly by legislative period